Edgar Santana Familia (born October 16, 1991) is a Dominican professional baseball pitcher who is a free agent. He has previously played in Major League Baseball (MLB) for the Pittsburgh Pirates and Atlanta Braves.

Career

Pittsburgh Pirates
Santana signed with the Pittsburgh Pirates as an international free agent in October 2013. He made his professional debut in 2014 with the Dominican Summer League Pirates and spent the whole season there, going 1–3 with a 3.66 ERA in 19.2 relief innings pitched. He played 2015 with the West Virginia Black Bears and West Virginia Power where he posted a combined 1–0 record and 3.19 ERA in 22 relief appearances. In 2016 he pitched for the Bradenton Marauders, Altoona Curve and Indianapolis Indians, compiling a combined 4–1 record and 2.71 ERA in 43 appearances out of the bullpen, and after the season pitched in the Arizona Fall League.

Santana started 2017 with the Indianapolis Indians, and was called up to the Pirates on June 10. He made his MLB debut that day against the Miami Marlins, in which he pitched an inning, allowing one run on three hits and striking out two. He was recalled and optioned multiple times during the season. In 44 games for Indianapolis he was 1–3 with a 2.79 ERA, and in 19 games for the Pirates he compiled a 3.50 ERA. Santana began 2018 in Pittsburgh's bullpen, and pitched to a 3.26 ERA with 54 strikeouts in 66.1 innings of work.

Santana underwent Tommy John surgery in October 2018 after suffering a torn UCL, and missed the entire 2019 season. On June 28, 2020, Santana was suspended 80 games for testing positive for Boldenone, and missed the entire 2020 season. On April 5, 2021, Santana was designated for assignment following the waiver claim of Kyle Keller.

Atlanta Braves
On April 9, 2021, Santana was traded to the Atlanta Braves in exchange for cash considerations.  On April 30, 2021, Santana made his first MLB appearance since the 2018 season, allowing 1 run in 1.0 inning.
On October 27, Santana was released by the Braves.

References

External links

1991 births
Living people
Altoona Curve players
Atlanta Braves players
Bradenton Marauders players
Dominican Republic expatriate baseball players in the United States
Dominican Summer League Pirates players
Indianapolis Indians players
Major League Baseball pitchers
Major League Baseball players from the Dominican Republic
People from Puerto Plata, Dominican Republic
Pittsburgh Pirates players
Surprise Saguaros players
West Virginia Black Bears players
West Virginia Power players
Gigantes del Cibao players